The Ravula (Adyar in Malayalam, Yerava in Kannada) are a tribal community in Karnataka and Kerala. Their common language is known as the Ravula language. They live predominantly the Kodagu district of Karnataka along with its adjacent regions in the districts of Kannur and Wayanad in Kerala. Most of them are agricultural workers and are in the process of detribalization. It is believed that they were agricultural serfs in the past. During the annual festival at the Valliyurkkavu temple in Mananthavady, Wayand, the Adyar people gather to trade services with landlords.

Their settlements are called 'Kunju.' They are monogamous, and mostly practice negotiated marriage, although there are several elopement marriages among them.

Currently, Ravula is very backward. They are mostly agricultural laborers in coffee plantations and tea estates, although some are employed by the Forest Department or in other occupations. Yerevan tribals believe in magic, and are animists, although they still perform worship to Hindu deities like Chamundeswariamma and Kaveriamma. They have their own system of medicines.

References

External links

Kerala society
Karnataka society
Scheduled Tribes of India
Dravidian peoples
Social groups of Kerala
Social groups of Karnataka